Linwood is an unincorporated community in Lafayette Township, Madison County, Indiana.

Linwood was likely named for the presence of linden trees. It was originally called Funk's Station.

Geography

References

Unincorporated communities in Madison County, Indiana
Unincorporated communities in Indiana
Indianapolis metropolitan area